Seán O'Connor (born 1981) is an Irish sportsperson.  He plays hurling with his local club Ahane and with the Limerick senior inter-county team.

References 

1981 births
Living people
Ahane hurlers
Limerick inter-county hurlers